Recorded Live at Oil Can Harry's is a live album by US jazz pianist Ahmad Jamal, featuring four pieces recorded at Oil Can Harry's (a nightclub in Vancouver) on August 13, 1976. Performing with Jamal are Calvin Keys on guitar, John Heard on double bass, Frank Gant on drums. Additional percussion is by Seldon Newton. Catalyst Records released the album in 1976.

Track listing

Reception
Jazz reviewer/historian Scott Yanow awarded the album four stars. He mentions in his review that the album "gives listeners an excellent example of the playing of pianist Ahmad Jamal in the mid-1970s".

Emmy Award winner Michael K. Leader (now President of Leader Cinema Systems, Inc) was the Recording Engineer of note for the album Ahmad Jamal Recorded Live at Oil Can Harry's .   According to Leader, Gary Barclay, then the jazz producer for CHQM-FM in Vancouver Canada, was the producer of note for this album, and NOT Ahmad Jamal as listed in the credits.

The Oil Can Harry’s August 8, 1975 performance was recorded live for the 'Saturday All Nite Jazz Show' on CHQM.  Under the terms of AFM (American Federation of Musicians of The United States and Canada) Contract NO:   C-19029, this is a Radio Broadcast Contract. The use specifically covers a one time broadcast use for which the performers were paid at the broadcast rate. This is NOT a recording contract and does not contain any provisions for a recorded work to be released on the retail market.

Unfortunately, on the CD version of this concert, Jamal’s unaccompanied piano solo on the introduction of “Folklore” has been severely edited. Some existing 
LP versions include the complete solo, and these are well worth searching for.

References

External links
 
 

Ahmad Jamal live albums
1976 live albums
Catalyst Records (jazz) live albums